Yi An-Sa (Hangul: 이안사, Hanja: 李安社; ? - 1274) was a nobleman  during the Goryeo periods. He was the father of Ikjo of Joseon, the grandfather of Dojo of Joseon and the great-grandfather of Hwanjo of Joseon, also the great-great-grandfather of Taejo of Joseon, the founder of the Joseon Dynasty.

In 28 July 1392, when Taejo made a new dynasty, he was granted the royal title King Mok (목왕, 穆王). After his death in 1274, he was buried in Deokneung, Neung-ri, Gapyeong-myeon, Siheung-gun, Hamgyeongnam-do, North Korea and given the temple name Mokjo (목조, 穆祖) by his great-great-great-grandson, King Taejong in 22 April 1411 along with his posthumous name.

Family
Father: Yi Yang-mu (이양무, died 1231)
Grandfather: Yi-Rin (이린)
Grandmother: Lady, of the Nampyeong Mun clan (부인 남평문씨) – oldest daughter of Mun Geuk-gyeom (문극겸).
Mother: Lady, of the Samcheok Yi clan (부인 삼척이씨)
Grandfather: Yi Gang-je (이강제)
Younger brother: Yi Yeong-pil (이영필)
Younger brother: Yi Yeong-mil (이영밀)
Younger brother: Yi Yeong-seup (이영습) 
Wife: Queen Hyogong of the Pyeonchang Yi clan (효공왕후 이씨)
1st son: Yi Eo-seon, Grand Prince Ancheon (이어선 안천대군)
2nd son: Yi Jin, Grand Prince Anwon (이진 안원대군)
3rd son: Yi Jeong, Grand Prince Anpung (이정 안풍대군)
4th son: Yi Haeng-ni (이행리)
5th son: Yi Mae-bul, Grand Prince Anchang (이매불 안창대군)
6th son: Yi Gu-su, Grand Prince Anheung (이구수 안흥대군)

References

13th-century Korean people
House of Yi
Year of birth unknown
Date of birth unknown
1274 deaths
Goryeo people